Guntupalli is located in western part of Vijayawada in the Indian state of Andhra Pradesh. It is a Rural area falls under Ibrahimpatnam mandal in Vijayawada revenue division of NTR district. Guntupalli Railway Wagon Workshop is located here. There is a proposal to merge this village into Vijayawada Municipal Corporation (VMC) to form a Greater Vijayawada Municipal Corporation.

Demographics 
 census, the town had a population of 11,187. The total population constitute, 5,573 males and 5,614 females —a sex ratio of 1007 females per 1000 males. 993 children are in the age group of 0–6 years, of which 521 are boys and 472 are girls —a ratio of 906 per 1000. The average literacy rate stands at 85.18% with 8,683 literates, significantly higher than the state average of 67.41%.

Jainism was once practiced and is supported by the Jain remnants at the site.

Transport 

APSRTC operates city buses from Vijayawada. Rayanapadu railway station is the nearby railway station to the town. The town is located 10 km to the west of Vijayawada on NH 65. It has the wagon workshop of Indian Railways.

Education 
The primary and secondary school education is imparted by government, aided and private schools, under the School Education Department of the state. Several schools and colleges run by Private, Local government, state government and central government.

See also 
List of census towns in Andhra Pradesh

References

Citations

Sources
 

Census towns in Andhra Pradesh
Cities and towns in NTR district